Samuel Pepper (born 26 March 1989) is an English internet personality. He created his YouTube channel in 2010, accumulating over 2 million subscribers and 55 million video views . He joined TikTok in 2020 and has amassed more than 4 million followers there as of October 2021.

Early life 
Samuel Pepper was born on 26 March 1989 in Ashford, Kent. He is half Greek. He attended Pent Valley Technology College in Cheriton, Kent.

Career

Big Brother 11 and early media career (2010–2014) 
In 2010, Pepper took part in the 11th season of the British reality television series Big Brother as a housemate, entering the house on day 52 as Laura's replacement as part of the "Ignore the Obvious" task. He was evicted on day 73 with 14.6% of the public vote.

On 8 September 2010, Pepper created his YouTube channel and began uploading videos, mainly consisting of pranks, voicing himself in Element Animation's The Crack! in 2011. From late-2013 to mid-2014, Pepper, alongside friend and fellow YouTube personality Marius "Maz" Listhrop, began his worldwide comedy tour, "WDGAF Tour".

Growth and controversy (2014–2015)

"Fake Hand Ass Pinch Prank" 
In September 2014, Pepper uploaded a controversial video titled "Fake Hand Ass Pinch Prank". In the video, Pepper would go up to women and ask for directions before pinching their buttocks. Soon after the video was published, many people online (later identified as trolls) claimed to have been sexually harassed by Pepper in the video, which soon gained mainstream media attention. Subsequently, the hashtag #ReportSamPepper trended on Twitter, along with many people criticising Pepper's actions. Pepper released another video a few days later where women would go behind men and pinch their buttocks. On the same day, he published another video explaining that his first prank was a "social experiment" and that the video was "staged and scripted" with actors, the online claims of "participants" having been fake. He went on to say that bringing attention to the issue of sexual harassment was "the focal point of the experiment", with the harassment claims online untrue jokes. Pepper removed both of these videos from YouTube shortly after their releases. Rival video blogger Laci Green consequently published a video called "Sam Pepper Exposed", addressing the online harassment allegation campaign on Pepper. Green also wrote an open letter calling on Pepper to "stop violating women and making them uncomfortable on the street for views". The letter received more than 100 thousand signatures.

"Killing Best Friend Prank" 
In November 2015, Pepper uploaded a video entitled "Killing Best Friend Prank". The video features internet personalities Sam Golbach and Colby Brock. In the video, a masked Pepper kidnaps Golbach and Brock (both of whom were in actuality in on the prank alongside Pepper), who are parked at an unknown location, shoving Golbach into the trunk of the car with a bag over his head. Brock helps Pepper tie up Golbach and take him to a rooftop, where he is forced to watch Pepper "shoot" Brock, leaving Golbach in tears. The video caused a backlash on social media, also hitting media headlines. British newspaper Metro compared the video to an "ISIS-style execution". A subsequent online petition to have Pepper removed from YouTube gained over 100,000 signatures. In an interview with Metro, Pepper stated that the criticism towards the video and himself was "shocking". In the same interview, Golbach stated that the message of the video was "about living life to the full... not taking life for granted and loving it because it's short". In response to the ongoing criticism, Pepper started a GoFundMe campaign, stating that he would delete his YouTube channel if $1.5 million was pledged to him. The campaign was removed shortly afterwards, along with the accompanying video that was posted on his YouTube channel.

Apology and rebranding (2016–present) 
On 21 February 2016, Pepper made all of his YouTube videos private and deleted all of his tweets, save for one stating "I give up". He uploaded a 20-minute video on 24 February titled "i'm sorry". In the video, Pepper confessed that many of his pranks, including his controversial "Killing Best Friend Prank", were staged. He also denied all online allegations of harassment towards him, attributed to a trolling campaign. He apologised for his videos, calling himself an "idiot" and stated that he would continue uploading on YouTube and "make content that I really believe in". After the video was published, Pepper stopped uploading prank videos and began uploading vlogs, subsequently receiving a more positive response.

In 2018, Pepper stopped uploading on his main channel and rebranded to his "Sam Pepper Live" channel, where he began vlogging and frequently live streaming alongside fellow live streamer Ice Poseidon. The following year, Pepper rebranded once again and became inactive on YouTube, subsequently shifting to TikTok. He mainly posts short comedy videos consisting of "challenge videos, life–hacks, and stunts"; the Metro described his presence on the platform as a "fully-fledged comeback".

Save the Kids scandal 
In 2021, Pepper, who was living and frequently collaborating with former FaZe Clan member Frazier Khattri (FaZe Kay), was accused by Khattri and YouTube investigator Coffeezilla of ordering a developer on the cryptocurrency Save the Kids token to change a mechanism within the currency, which after its change, would allow for the cryptocurrency to be used as a pump and dump scheme. Both Khattri and Pepper have denied substantial involvement in the Save the Kids scandal, though Khattri has come out against Pepper claiming that Pepper's "plan" was to make $1,000,000 USD from the token and vanish forever. Pepper has yet to comment specifically on Khattri's allegations, who has further vowed never to work or be associated with Pepper ever again. Coffeezilla, however, alleged that Khattri was, contrary to Khattri's claims, significantly involved in Save the Kids from the start.

Immediately subsequent to Khattri's comments, some users on Twitter nicknamed Pepper "Scam Pepper", though Pepper was known to swiftly block anyone who used the nickname.

References

External links

1989 births
Big Brother (British TV series) contestants
British expatriates in the United States
English people of Greek descent
English video bloggers
English YouTubers
Living people
Male bloggers
People from Ashford, Kent
Prank YouTubers
YouTube controversies
British TikTokers
British Internet celebrities